The 1994 Russian Indoor Athletics Championships was the 3rd edition of the national championship in indoor track and field for Russia. It was held on 26–27 February at the JC "Jubilee" Stadium in Lipetsk. A total of 28 events (14 for men and 14 for women) were contested over the two-day competition.

Championships
In the winter of 1994, Russian championships were also held in the following disciplines:

30 January — Russian 12-Hour Run Indoor Championships (Moscow)
4–5 February — Russian Combined Events Indoor Championships (Lipetsk)
26 February – Russian 24-Hour Run Indoor Championships (Podolsk)

Results

Men

Women

Russian 12-Hour Run Indoor Championships 
The Russian 12-Hour Run Indoor Championships was held on 30 January in Moscow in the RGAFK arena. Leonid Krupsky set a world indoor record of 159,736 m.

Russian Combined Events Indoor Championships 
The Russian Combined Events Indoor Championships were determined on 4–5 February 1994 in Lipetsk in the Yubileiny Palace of Sports. Larisa Turchinskaya set the best season result in the world - 4758 points.

Men

Women

Russian 24-Hour Run Indoor Championships 
The Russian 24-Hour Run Indoor Championships was held on February 26 in Podolsk on the 133-meter circle of the arena of the local youth sports school.

Men

Women

International team selection
According to the results of the championship, taking into account qualifying standards, the Russian team for the 1994 European Athletics Indoor Championships included:

Men

60 m: Aleksandr Porkhomovskiy†, Pavel Galkin
200 m: Aleksandr Porkhomovskiy†, Andrey Fedoriv
400 m: Mikhail Vdovin
800 m: Andrey Loginov
1500 m: Vyacheslav Shabunin
3000 m: Andrey Tikhonov
High jump: Grigory Fedorkov, Leonid Pumalainen
Pole vault: Denis Petushinskiy†, Igor Trandenkov, Pyotr Bochkarev 
Long jump: Stanislav Tarasenko†, Dmitry Bagryanov
Triple jump: Leonid Voloshin†, Denis Kapustin, Vasiliy Sokov
Shot put: Yevgeny Palchikov
5000 m walk: Mikhail Shchennikov, Vladimir Andreyev

Women

60 m:Olga Bogoslovskaya, Natalya Anisimova
200 m: Galina Malchugina†, Olga Bogoslovskaya
400 m: Tatyana Alekseyeva, Svetlana Goncharenko
1500 m: Yekaterina Podkopayeva, Lyudmila Rogachova
3000 m: Olga Kovpotina
60 m hurdles: Eva Sokolova†, Svetlana Laukhova
High jump: Yelena Gulyayeva, Elena Topchina
Long jump: Yelena Sinchukova, Lyudmila Galkina
Triple jump: Inna Lasovskaya†, Anna Biryukova†
Shot put: Larisa Peleshenko, Anna Romanova
Pentathlon: Larisa Turchinskaya, Lyudmila Mikhailova
3000 m walk: Yelena Arshintseva, Yelena Nikolayeva

† Had exemption for selection and allowed not to compete at the national championships

References

Results
Тихонов С. Липецк принимает «королеву» // Лёгкая атлетика : журнал. — 1994. — № 3. — С. 2—3.

Russian Indoor Athletics Championships
Russian Indoor Athletics Championships
Russian Indoor Athletics Championships
Russian Indoor Athletics Championships
Sport in Lipetsk